The 2010 Family Circle Cup was a women's tennis event on the 2010 WTA Tour, which took place from April 12 to April 18. It was the 38th edition of the event and was hosted at the Family Circle Tennis Center, in Charleston, South Carolina, United States. It was the second and last event of the clay court season played on green clay. The total prize money offered at this tournament was US$700,000. Samantha Stosur won the singles title.

Entrants

Seeds

Rankings are as of April 5, 2010.

Other entrants 
The following players received wildcards into the main draw:
  Mallory Cecil
  Carly Gullickson
  Alison Riske

The following players received entry from the qualifying draw:
  Monique Adamczak ''(as a lucky loser)
  Catalina Castaño
  Sophie Ferguson
  Ekaterina Ivanova
  Christina McHale
  Chanelle Scheepers
  Anna Tatishvili
  Mashona Washington
  Heather Watson

Notable withdrawals
The following players withdrew from the tournament for various reasons:
  Kateryna Bondarenko (left knee injury)
  Dominika Cibulková (right groin injury)
  Alisa Kleybanova (bilateral plantar fasciitis)
  Sabine Lisicki (left ankle injury)
  Maria Sharapova  (right elbow bone bruise)
  Serena Williams (left knee injury)

Finals

Singles

 Samantha Stosur defeated  Vera Zvonareva, 6–0, 6–3
It was Stosur's first title of the year and second of her career.

Doubles

 Liezel Huber /  Nadia Petrova defeated  Vania King /  Michaëlla Krajicek, 6–3, 6–4

References

External links

 Official website
 ITF tournament edition details

Family Circle Cup
Charleston Open
Family Circle Cup
Family Circle Cup
Family Circle Cup